The 1972 National Soccer League season was the forty-ninth season under the National Soccer League (NSL) name. The season began in late April and concluded in October with the Canadian Open Cup final. Toronto Croatia successfully defended its regular-season title for the third consecutive season with an undefeated regular season streak. Toronto would also defeat the Serbian White Eagles for the NSL Cup. The Croatians would secure a treble by winning the Open Canada Cup against Vancouver Columbus. In the playoffs, Toronto Italia defeated the Serbian White Eagles for the NSL Championship.

Overview 
The ownership of the National Soccer League (NSL) was in discussions with the British Columbia Premier League to form a western division, but the project failed to materialize. The membership in the NSL increased to 15 clubs with the return of Toronto Italia, and the acceptance of the Hamilton Italo-Canadians. The return of Toronto Italia further intensified the rivalry between the NSL and the Toronto Metros of the North American Soccer League as the Italian diaspora played a decisive factor in the potential increase in match attendance. Another point of contention between the Metros and the NSL was a dispute stemming from a potential player raid on the NSL's youth division. The Hamilton club was granted an NSL franchise and had credentials in the Inter-City Soccer League.   

The league became once more centered in Southern Ontario as it lost its presence in Northern Ontario with the departure of Sudbury City. The NSL began to experience an increase in match attendance since their initial decrease and stagnation in the mid-1960s.

Teams

Coaching changes

Standings

Playoffs

Finals

Canadian Open Cup 
The Canadian Open Cup was a tournament organized by the National Soccer League in 1971 where the NSL champion would face the Challenge Trophy winners to determine the best team throughout the country. Toronto Croatia was the NSL representative for the second consecutive year while their opponents were the British Columbia Premier League champions Vancouver Columbus. New Westminster Blues was the 1972 Challenge Trophy winner but declined the invitation which allowed Vancouver Columbus to compete for the title.

References

External links
RSSSF CNSL page
thecnsl.com - 1972 season

1972–73 domestic association football leagues
National Soccer League
1972